Xiang Changle (born April 1963) is a Chinese engineer currently serving as party secretary of Dalian University of Technology, Previously he served as vice-president and executive deputy secretary of Beijing Institute of Technology.

Biography
Xiang was born in Lu'an, Anhui, in April 1963. He earned his bachelor's degree in 1984, a master's degree in 1987, and a doctor's degree in 2001, all from Beijing Institute of Technology. He was a visiting scholar in the United States between 1999 and 2000. 

In November 2014 he was promoted to vice-president of Beijing Institute of Technology. In June 2016, he became secretary of China Association for Science and Technology. On November 8, 2019, he was appointed executive deputy secretary of the university.

Honours and awards
 November 22, 2019 Member of the Chinese Academy of Engineering (CAE)

References

1963 births
Living people
People from Lu'an
Beijing Institute of Technology alumni
Academic staff of Beijing Institute of Technology
Members of the Chinese Academy of Engineering